Jean (or Joanny) Bricaud (11 February 1881, Neuville-sur-Ain, Ain – 24 February 1934), also known as Tau Jean II, was a French student of the occult and esoteric matters. Bricaud was heavily involved in the French neo-Gnostic movement. He was consecrated a Gnostic bishop on 21 July 1913 by bishop Louis-Marie-François Giraud. He was the Patriarch of the Église Gnostique Universelle (French for "Universal Gnostic Church") and a central figure in the various lines of the apostolic succession of subsequent Gnostic churches, as well as a spiritual heir of Jules Doinel (Valentinus II). From 1916 he was head of the Ordre Martiniste. He was a friend of the occultists Papus and August Vandekerkhove.

References

External links
 
 

1881 births
1934 deaths
People from Ain
French occultists
Bishops of Independent Catholic denominations
Gnosticism
Martinism
Place of death missing
20th-century occultists